Thomas Britton "Britt" Harris IV is the current chief investment officer of the University of Texas/Texas A&M Investment Management Company. The investment management company oversees the assets of The University of Texas and Texas A&M University. In 2013 Harris was announced as the recipient of the aiCIO Lifetime Achievement Award. He founded and has led Titans of Investing since 2006.

Career
Harris graduated from Texas A&M University with a degree in finance in 1980. He began his career at Texas Utilities, leaving to join Asea Brown Boveri. He was then named chief investment officer of Verizon Investment Management, Verizon Communications' employee benefit trust. He subsequently left Verizon to serve as the chief executive officer of Bridgewater Associates, at the time the largest hedge fund in the world. Harris spent only six months at Bridgewater due to a culture fit problem, however Ray Dalio, the firm's founder and chief executive following Harris' departure, noted that "Mr. Harris is a superstar, with an absolutely fantastic character. He's an industry leader." Following Bridgewater, Harris was appointed chief investment officer of the Teacher Retirement System of Texas (Also known as TRS), Texas' pension plan for public teachers. During Harris' tenure at TRS, the value of their pension fund grew from $67 billion at the time of the 2007-2008 financial crisis, to $140 billion at the time of Harris' departure from the company in June 2017. On June 16, 2017, it was announced that Harris would be leaving his position at the Teacher Retirement System of Texas to become the new chief investment officer of the University of Texas Investment Management Company (Also known as UTIMCO), an investment management company that oversees the assets of two of the largest public universities in the United States: The University of Texas and Texas A&M University. Harris began as chief investment officer of UTIMCO on August 1, 2017. 

Harris is a member of the President's Working Group on Financial Markets, the Federal Reserve Bank of New York's Investor Advisory Committee on Financial Markets, and has also served in several leadership positions in the investment community, including chairman of the Council for the Investment of Employee Benefit Assets and an advisor to the New York Stock Exchange. He is currently an executive professor of finance at Texas A&M University and has served as a guest lecturer on investment management and public policy at Harvard University, Princeton University, Yale University, and The University of Texas at Austin.

Harris has been listed as one of aiCIO "most influential and powerful asset owners on earth" since the magazine's inaugural rankings in 2012, most recently placing 2nd in the 2017 list. He was ranked 2nd in 2016, 4th in 2012, 6th in 2013, and 4th in both 2014 and 2015. Harris was a participant in the 2012 Bilderberg Meetings.

Titans of Investing 
Titans of Investing is an elite collegiate student program founded and led by Harris since 2006. As of Fall 2021, its alumni network consists of 700 Titan graduates.

Personal
Harris is married and has four children. He currently lives in Austin, Texas and is an active member in the Christian community.

References

Living people
American chief executives of financial services companies
Texas A&M University alumni
Chief investment officers
1958 births